Jacques O'Neill (born 8 May 1999) is an English professional rugby league footballer who most recently played as a  or  for the Castleford Tigers in the Betfred Super League.

He has previously played for the Leigh Centurions and Halifax in the Betfred Championship on loan and dual registration from Castleford.

Early life
O'Neill was born in Barrow-in-Furness, Cumbria, England. 

He played junior rugby league for Askam ARLFC before being signed to the Castleford Tigers academy. After earning his academy contract, he was driven from Cumbria to Castleford twice a week for training by his mother. He currently lives in Leeds.

Club career

Castleford Tigers 
In August 2015, at the age of 16, O'Neill signed his first professional contract with Castleford after progressing through the club's academy. The contract spanned two-and-a-half years and would see him step up into the Tigers' under-19s.

On 1 March 2019, O'Neill made his Super League début for Castleford against Hull Kingston Rovers. In August, he signed a new one-year deal with the Tigers. He scored his first try on 10 August against the London Broncos, and finished his breakthrough season with 11 appearances.

O'Neill signed a further one-year contract extension with Castleford in September 2020; head coach Daryl Powell said of him, "Attitude wise he is spot on. He gets after things. He needs to stay focused and I'm sure he will, and he will end up being an outstanding rugby league player." O'Neill made 12 appearances and scored 2 tries throughout the 2020 season, and was voted as the League Express Young Player of the Year.

In June 2021, O'Neill signed a new two-year deal with Castleford, stating, "I've been at Cas since I was 15/16 and it has a place in my heart now, I wasn't really looking to go anywhere else." A persistent hamstring injury severely disrupted his season, limiting him to just 6 appearances and forcing him to miss the 2021 Challenge Cup Final. He underwent a hamstring re-attachment operation after his campaign was cut short, and began a steady rehabilitation process.

On 10 June 2022, Castleford announced that O'Neill had been released from his contract "to allow him to pursue another opportunity" of appearing on the ITV reality show Love Island. The Tigers have the first option to sign O'Neill back if he decides to return to rugby league next year. On 13 July, immediately following O'Neill's exit from the show, he visited a training session at the club, although regarding a return head coach Lee Radford said, "It is something we've not spoken about. That is probably a conversation to have further down the line I think."

Leigh Centurions (loan) 
In 2018, O'Neill joined the Leigh Centurions on a short-term loan to play in the Championship Shield Final. He was drafted in alongside 6 other academy players from Wigan and St Helens after the club revealed they would not have enough fit players to fulfil the fixture.

Halifax (dual registration) 
In 2019, O'Neill played one game for Halifax in the Championship through their dual registration arrangement with Castleford.

International career 
O'Neill represented England Under-16s in their international series against France Under-16s in April 2015. He played as a hooker in both the 16-6 victory at Belle Vue on 3 April, scoring a try and receiving a Man of the Match award, and the 20-8 defeat at Post Office Road on 7 April.

In April 2021, O'Neill was selected in the England Knights performance squad.

Personal life 
He was diagnosed with ADHD at age 9.

In 2022, O'Neill became a contestant on the eighth series of Love Island. Ahead of his entrance, it was revealed he was the ex-boyfriend of fellow contestant Gemma Owen. Gemma's father is ex-England footballer Michael Owen. He decided to leave the villa on Day 37 for mental health purposes and to "get back to himself". Castleford Tigers offered O'Neill welfare support and spoke of the club's focus to support and welcome him at Wheldon Road.

Statistics 

(* denotes season still competing)

References

External links

Castleford Tigers profile
SL profile

1999 births
Living people
Castleford Tigers players
English rugby league players
Halifax R.L.F.C. players
Leigh Leopards players
Rugby league hookers
Rugby league players from Barrow-in-Furness
Love Island (2015 TV series) contestants